Chen Chung Chang (Chinese: 张晨钟) was a mathematician who worked in model theory. He obtained  his PhD from Berkeley in 1955 on "Cardinal and Ordinal Factorization of Relation Types" under Alfred Tarski. He wrote the standard text  on model theory. Chang's conjecture and Chang's model are named after him. He also proved the ordinal partition theorem (expressed in the arrow notation for Ramsey theory) ωω→(ωω,3)2, originally a problem of Erdős and Hajnal. He also introduced MV-algebras as models for Łukasiewicz logic. Chang was a professor at the mathematics department of the University of California, Los Angeles.

Selected publications 

 C. C. Chang. Algebraic analysis of many-valued logics. Transactions of the American Mathematical Society, 88, 467–490, 1958,

External links

20th-century American mathematicians
21st-century American mathematicians
Model theorists
University of California, Berkeley alumni
University of California, Los Angeles faculty
1927 births
2014 deaths